The Cathedral of Saint Christopher of Belfort (French: Cathédrale Saint-Christophe de Belfort), commonly known as Belfort Cathedral, is a Roman Catholic church located in Belfort, France. The cathedral has been a national monument since 1930.

The building that is now the cathedral was built as a church between 1727 and 1750 by the businessman Henri Schuller (or Shuler) (whose son was later a canon here) to plans by Jacques Philippe Mareschal, king's engineer at Strasbourg. It was built of red sandstone excavated from the quarry at Offemont, three kilometres from Belfort.

Although the church opened for worship in 1750, the north tower was not completed until 1845.

It contains an organ by the organ-builder Joseph Valtrin, installed in 1752 and now classed as an historic monument in its own right.

On 3 November 1979 the Diocese of Belfort–Montbéliard was created from part of the territory of the Archdiocese of Besançon. The seat of the bishop was established at Belfort, and St. Christopher's Church was elevated to the status of cathedral.

External links
 
Location
  Diocese of Belfort: official website

Roman Catholic churches completed in 1750
Roman Catholic cathedrals in France
Churches in the Territoire de Belfort
Basilica churches in France
Buildings and structures in Belfort
18th-century Roman Catholic church buildings in France